Krichev is a military air base in the Mogilev Region, Belarus.  It is located in Klimavichy District, 13 km east of the city of Krychaw.  The base served the interceptor air defense role for the Soviet Air Force, hosted by the 28th Fighter Aviation Regiment, 2nd Air Defence Corps, Moscow Air Defence District.

History
Krichev had been observed by 1957 by Western Lockheed U-2 overflights.  The 28th IAP operated the Sukhoi Su-9 (NATO: Fishpot) regiment in the 1960s and 1970s.  By 1981, the regiment was one of four in the USSR still operating the Su-9 but its facilities were being upgraded, and it received the Mikoyan-Gurevich MiG-25 (NATO: Foxbat) in the mid-1980s.

The base was closed in 1993, after the Cold War, and the aviation regiment was disbanded.

References

Russian Air Force bases
Soviet Air Force bases
Soviet Air Defence Force bases
Klimavichy District